Clypeidae is a family of sea urchins belonging to the order Clypeasteroida.

Fossil record
This family is known in the fossil record from the Jurassic (Bajocian age)  to Cretaceous (Santonian age) (age range: from about 164.7 to 94.3 million years ago). Fossils of species within this genus have been found in Egypt, France, Portugal, Saudi Arabia, Switzerland, Ukraine, the United Arab Emirates, Chile, Ethiopia, Germany, India, Kenya, Madagascar, Poland, Saudi Arabia, Somalia, Tunisia, United Kingdom and United States.

Genera
Genera within this family include:
Astrolampas Pomel 1883
Clypeus Leske 1778
Colliclypeus Smith 1991
Pseudopygurus
Pygurus Agassiz 1839

References

External links

Clypeasteroida